The 22653 /22654 Thiruvananthapuram Central–Hazrat Nizamuddin Superfast Express is a Express train belonging to Indian Railways – Southern Railway zone that runs between  and  in India.

It operates as train number 22653 from Thiruvananthapuram Central to Hazrat Nizamuddin and as train number 22654 in the reverse direction, serving the states of Kerala, Karnataka, Goa, Maharashtra, Gujarat, Madhya Pradesh, Rajasthan, Uttar Pradesh, Haryana & Delhi.

Coaches

The 22653 / 54 Thiruvananthapuram Central–Hazrat Nizamuddin Superfast Express has two AC 2 tier, six AC 3 tier, eight Sleeper class, four General Unreserved & two EOG (End on generation) coaches. It does not carry a pantry car.

Service

Routing

References

External links
22653 Thiruvananthapuram Hazrat Nizamuddin Superfast Express at India Rail Info
22654 Hazrat Nizamuddin Thiruvananthapuram Superfast Express at India Rail Info

Transport in Delhi
Transport in Thiruvananthapuram
Express trains in India
Rail transport in Kerala
Rail transport in Karnataka
Rail transport in Goa
Rail transport in Maharashtra
Rail transport in Gujarat
Rail transport in Rajasthan
Rail transport in Delhi
Railway services introduced in 2015
Rail transport in Madhya Pradesh
Rail transport in Haryana